Ayungon, officially the Municipality of Ayungon,  is a 2nd class municipality in the province of Negros Oriental, Philippines. According to the 2020 census, it has a population of 47,102 people.

Attractions include the Karalaon Bird Sanctuary, the subterranean area of the Mabato Caves, and the Pagsalsalan Twin Falls (Maaslum Falls).

History
It is said that Ayungon is derived from the name of a deaf man, “Ayung,” who cut down a “dungon” tree. Old municipal profiles refer to Ayungon as Todos los Santos though there are no legends to explain that Hispanic name, just as there are no tales elaborating on the ruins of apparently Hispanic fortifications on the Tampocon II shoreline, perhaps because Ayungon's colonial past was not entirely its own: for many years it was a mere barrio of Tayasan, until 1924 when Governor General Leonard Wood came to establish Ayungon as a full-fledged municipality.

Geography 

Ayungon is located on the midriff of Oriental Negros’ northern stretch, approximately two hours from Dumaguete.

Of only three virgin forests said to be still remaining on Negros Island, one is located in barangay Banban.

Barangays

Ayungon is politically subdivided into 24 barangays.

Climate

Demographics

Economy 

Ayungon is mostly rural with vast rice fields, dense coconut groves and expansive plantations of sugar cane, bananas and pineapple.

References

External links
 [ Philippine Standard Geographic Code]
Philippine Census Information
Official Website
Local Governance Performance Management System

Municipalities of Negros Oriental